Jack Orman is an American television writer, producer and director. He worked extensively on ER, eventually becoming an executive producer.

Early life
Orman grew up in Paradise Valley, Arizona, and earned his bachelor's degree in communications (film) from Loyola Marymount University. He produced an international documentary in Asia before earning a master of fine arts degree from USC's Peter Stark Producing Program.

Career
Orman made his script writing debut as a freelance writer for an episode of JAG. The script was so well-received that Orman was hired as a staff writer and within half a season Paramount Television made him a co-producer on the show. Orman contributed a further 8 episodes over the next year and a half.

Following his success on JAG, Orman was recruited to join the production team of ER in 1997. He became a writer and co-producer on the fourth season of ER. He was promoted to supervising producer for the fifth season and continued to write episodes. He became a co-executive producer for the sixth season. Orman then became an executive producer and the series show runner for the seventh season. He also made his television directing debut on the eighth season. Orman wrote 28 episodes and directed 3 episodes during his time on ER.

Orman and the rest of the producers of ER were nominated for an Emmy award for Outstanding Drama Series for their work on the fourth season at the 1998 awards. Orman was nominated for this award along with the other producers for the next three years running for the fifth, sixth and seventh seasons of ER. The show also received several people's choice awards throughout Orman's time as a producer. His season 6 episode "All in the Family" was the series highest rated episode to date and was second only to the Seinfeld finale for the most watched episode of television and was included in Hollywood Reporter's list of the Top 10 Highest Rated Shows of the Decade.

After leaving ER Orman has created/executive produced further television series. Dr. Vegas was a short-lived comedic drama starring Rob Lowe and Joe Pantoliano. Orman's next series, the Rhode Island-based Waterfront, also starred Pantoliano and was picked up by the CBS network in 2006.

In 2009, Orman wrote and produced on the first season of Men of a Certain Age which received a Peabody Award

He created a television pilot for ABC and Sony Pictures Television in 2010 called "Matadors" about the law, secret societies, and love.

And in 2011, Orman created and executive produced Pan Am (TV series) again with ABC and Sony Pictures Television.

Orman continues to be active in television development.

Family life
He lives in Studio City, California with his wife, Lisa, and their five children. He has three sons, twin daughters, and their dog named Roman.

Filmography

Writer

Director

References

External links
 

Living people
American male television writers
American soap opera writers
USC School of Cinematic Arts alumni
Loyola Marymount University alumni
Year of birth missing (living people)